Hanneke is a feminine given name of Dutch origin, and may refer to:

Hanneke Beaumont (born 1947), Dutch-born sculptor
Hanneke Canters (1969–2002), Dutch feminist philosopher and academic
Hanneke Cassel (born 1978), American folk musician
Hanneke Hoefnagel (born 1988), Dutch gymnast
Hanneke Kappen (born 1954), a Dutch singer and radio and TV presenter
Hanneke Schuitemaker, Dutch virologist
Hanneke Smabers (born 1973), Dutch field hockey player

Dutch feminine given names